Gonzalo E. Vázquez is a Venezuelan investment banker. He is the founder and managing director of Vazas & Company, a financial advisory firm in Latin America.

Education
Gonzalo E. Vázquez has a BA in Economics from Southern Illinois University where he graduated in 1984. Subsequently, he attended Instituto de Estudios Superiores de Administración (IESA) in Caracas, Venezuela, to pursue more specialized studies, in particular the Advanced Corporate Finance Program (1986). He holds a MA and Ph.D. from the University of Miami, in the area of International Political Economy.

Published works
In 2012 Vázquez published An Evaluation of Brain Drain in the Case of the Venezuela's Petroleum Company, a University of Miami thesis. That was followed in Spring 2013 by Brain Drain from Venezuela’s Petroleum Giant, PDVSA, examining the historical context and social forces that shape the emigration of professionals from Venezuela’s government-owned oil company, Petróleos de Venezuela, S.A., (PDVSA), from 1999 to the 2013.

In 2015 Vázquez contributed a chapter to The Impact of Emerging Economies on Global Energy and the Environment, titled 25 Years of Contemporary History of PDVSA: Killing the Goose that Lays the Golden Eggs. In November 2019, Vázquez’s Ph.D. dissertation at the University of Miami Bolivarian Authoritarianism: Regime Change in Venezuela Under Hugo Chávez was published.

References

People from Caracas
Living people
American investment bankers
1959 births
Southern Illinois University alumni
University of Miami alumni